Miriam Bäckström (born 1967) is a Swedish conceptual photographer.

Bäckström was born in Stockholm in 1967. Bäckström studied history of art at the University of Stockholm before enrolling at Stockholm's Academy of Photography in 1994.

Bäckström first came to notice as a conceptual photographer in the 1990s.

References

1967 births
Living people
20th-century Swedish photographers
21st-century Swedish photographers
Artists from Stockholm